Lago di Sibolla is a lake in the Province of Lucca, Tuscany, Italy. Its surface area is 0.012 km2.

Lakes of Tuscany